Boing may refer to:

Places
 Boing, South Sudan, a town in Upper Nile state on the Yabus River

Arts, entertainment, and media

Music
 "Boing", a song by Ween from the album The Pod
 "Boing!" (song), a 2006 song by Nik & Jay
 "Boing!", a single by DJ Quicksilver, 1996

Television
 Boing (TV channel), a brand used for children's television channels owned by Turner Broadcasting System Europe:
Turner Broadcasting System:
 Boing (Africa), owned by TBS Europe
 Boing (France), owned by TBS France
Mediaset:
 Boing (Italy), owned by Mediaset and TBS Italia through joint venture Boing S.p.A.
 Boing (Spain), owned by Mediaset España and TBS España
 Gerald McBoing-Boing (TV series), a children's television series based on the film

Other uses in arts, entertainment, and media
 Boing Boing, a group blog
 Boing! Docomodake DS, a 2007 video game
 Gerald McBoing-Boing, a 1950 animated short film

Other uses 
 Pascual Boing, a Mexican beverage company that produces Boing! drinks

See also 
 Big Boing (disambiguation)
 Boeing, an American multinational aerospace and defense corporation
 Booing, showing displeasure by loudly yelling "Boo!" and sustaining the "oo" sound
 Boingo (disambiguation)